Maximillian 'Max' Palmer Hall (born 29 September 1975) is an English cricketer.  Hall is a right-handed batsman who bowls right-arm off break.  He was born in Surrey.

Hall represented the Surrey Cricket Board in 3 List A matches, the first of which came against Lincolnshire in the 2nd round of the 2002 Cheltenham & Gloucester Trophy which was played in 2001.  His final 2 List A matches came against the Gloucestershire Cricket Board and the Essex Cricket Board in the 1st and 2nd rounds of the 2003 Cheltenham & Gloucester Trophy which were held in 2002.  In his 3 List A matches, he scored 18 runs at a batting average of 9.00, with a high score of 14*.  In the field he took 3 catches.

He currently plays club cricket for Sunbury Cricket Club.

References

External links
Max Hall at Cricinfo
Max Hall at CricketArchive

1975 births
Living people
People from Surrey
English cricketers
Surrey Cricket Board cricketers